Antiguan and Barbudan passports are issued to nationals of Antigua and Barbuda for international travel. The passport is a CARICOM passport as Antigua and Barbuda is a member of the Caribbean Community.

History
Before Antigua and Barbuda achieved its independence from the United Kingdom in November 1981, the territory was a crown colony, and British territory passports were used.

Physical appearance 
The Antiguan and Barbudan passport shares the common design standards of CARICOM passports. The cover is dark blue (for civilians) with the country's coat of arms and country name as well as the CARICOM logo on the front cover.

Visa requirements 
In 2009, the Antiguan and Barbudan Government signed a visa waiver agreement with the European Union which allows an Antiguan and Barbudan citizen to visit the Schengen area without a visa for a period of 3 months within any 6-month period following the date of first entry into any EU country.

In 2016, Antiguan and Barbudan passport holders enjoyed visa-free or visa on arrival access (including eTAs) to 134 countries and territories, ranking the passport as the 30th best passport in the world according to the Visa Restrictions Index. Antiguan and Barbudan passport holders may travel to Hong Kong, Singapore, the UK, and Europe, among others, with relative ease and without challenging visa requirements.

 citizens of Antigua and Barbuda will need a visa to visit Canada. From that date, any existing electronic travel authorizations (eTAs) issued to a citizen of Antigua and Barbuda will become null and void, and affected individuals who had previously been issued an eTA will no longer be able to use that eTA for the purposes of traveling to Canada.

See also
 Caribbean passport
 Henley Passport Index
 Visa requirements for Antigua and Barbuda citizens
 Visa policy of Antigua and Barbuda

References

External links
 List of nationals who do need a visa to visit the UK.
 List of countries whose passport holders do not require visas to enter Ireland .

Antigua
Government of Antigua and Barbuda